Miss Lee is a 2019 South Korean television series starring Lee Hye-ri, Kim Sang-kyung, Uhm Hyun-kyung and Cha Seo-won. Created by Studio Dragon and produced by Logos Film, it aired on tvN from September 25 to November 14, 2019.

Synopsis
The story of an ordinary employee named Lee Seon-sim who suddenly becomes the CEO of the company she works at.

Cast

Main
 Lee Hye-ri as Lee Seon-sim
 Kim Sang-kyung as Yoo Jin-wook
 Uhm Hyun-kyung as Koo Ji-na
 Cha Seo-won as Park Do-joon

Supporting
 Baek Ji-won as Choi Yeong-ja
 Jung Hee-tae as Hwang Ji-sang
 Jung Soo-young as Lee Sun-shin
 Kim Eung-soo as Oh Man-bok
 Kim Hyung-mook as Moon Hyeong-seok
 Kwon Han-sol as Seo-eun
 Lee Hwa-ryong as Song Young-hoon
 Kim Jae-hyun as Idol star
 Christian Lagahit as Kisan

Viewership

References

External links
  
 
 

TVN (South Korean TV channel) television dramas
Korean-language television shows
2019 South Korean television series debuts
2019 South Korean television series endings
Television series by Studio Dragon
Television series by Logos Film